Mohammed "Moha" Rharsalla Khadfi (born 15 September 1993) is a Moroccan footballer who plays for TFF First League club Gençlerbirliği as a winger.

Club career

Huétor Tájar
Born in Oujda, Morocco, Moha moved to Spain at his teens and spent his youth career at Club Granada 74-Zaidín and CD Santa Fe, graduating with the latter in 2012. In that year's summer he moved to Tercera División side CD Huétor Tájar, making his senior debut on 14 October by coming on as a substitute in a 0–2 home loss against CD El Palo.

Moha scored his first senior goal on 1 September 2013, netting the winner in a 2–1 home success over Loja CD. He scored three goals in 21 appearances during the first half of the campaign before departing to Ukraine in January 2014.

Olimpik Donetsk
In March 2014, Moha signed a five-year contract with Ukrainian First League club FC Olimpik Donetsk. He made his professional debut on 5 April, replacing Maksym Drachenko at the half-time of a 1–0 home win against FC Desna Chernihiv; he appeared in a further six matches during the season, as his side was crowned champions.

Moha made his Ukrainian Premier League debut on 15 August 2014, again from the bench in a 0–5 home loss against FC Shakhtar Donetsk. He scored his first professional goal on 18 October, netting his team's second in a 2–2 away draw against FC Metalurh Zaporizhya.

Gimnàstic (loan)
On 19 July 2016, Moha was included in Gimnàstic de Tarragona's pre-season camp. Two days later, the Catalans announced his signing, a one-year loan deal with a buyout clause.

Moha made his debut in the second level on 21 August 2016, starting in a 2–2 home draw against CD Lugo. He scored his first goal for the club seven days later, netting a last-minute equalizer in a 1–1 draw at SD Huesca.

On 26 October 2016, Moha was separated from the squad after the player "failed to fulfill his sporting obligations".

Slovan Bratislava
On 25 January 2018, Moha signed 4,5 year contract with Slovak Super Liga side Slovan Bratislava.

Saudi Arabia
On 10 July 2021, Moha joined Al-Hazem. On 28 January 2022, Moha joined Al-Qadsiah.

Hassania Agadir
On 25 August 2022, Moha joined Hassania Agadir.

Gençlerbirliği
On 27 December 2022, Rharsalla agreed to join TFF First League club Gençlerbirliği on a one-and-a-half-year deal.

International career
In November 2014 Moha was called up for the Morocco national under-23 football team, and made his debut in a match against Egypt.

Honours
Olimpik Donetsk
Ukrainian First League: 2013–14

Slovan Bratislava
Fortuna Liga (3): 2018–19, 2019–20, 2020–21
Slovnaft Cup (3): 2017–18, 2019–20, 2020–21

References

External links

Moha Rharsalla profile at Footboom 
Moha Rharsalla profile at La Preferente 

1993 births
Living people
People from Oujda
Moroccan footballers
Morocco international footballers
Morocco youth international footballers
Association football wingers
Segunda División players
Tercera División players
Saudi Professional League players
Gimnàstic de Tarragona footballers
Ukrainian Premier League players
Ukrainian First League players
Slovak Super Liga players
Saudi First Division League players
FC Olimpik Donetsk players
ŠK Slovan Bratislava players
Al-Hazem F.C. players
Al-Qadsiah FC players
Hassania Agadir players
Gençlerbirliği S.K. footballers
Moroccan expatriate footballers
Expatriate footballers in Spain
Expatriate footballers in Ukraine
Expatriate footballers in Slovakia
Expatriate footballers in Saudi Arabia
Moroccan expatriate sportspeople in Spain
Moroccan expatriate sportspeople in Ukraine
Moroccan expatriate sportspeople in Slovakia
Moroccan expatriate sportspeople in Saudi Arabia